István Dobi (31 December 1898 – 24 November 1968) was a Hungarian politician who was Prime Minister of Hungary from 1948 to 1952 and Chairman of the Presidential Council of the Hungarian People's Republic from 1952 to 1967.

Early life
Dobi originated from a poor peasant family and was born in Szőny, in the Komárom County of the Kingdom of Hungary. He only completed six years primary school and started working as a day laborer from an early age. In 1916 came into contact with the agricultural workers' movement. After having fought in the First World War, he supported the Hungarian Soviet Republic. During the Hungarian–Romanian War of 1919 he was captured by the Romanians.

Upon his release, he worked as a casual laborer and became active in the agricultural workers' union as well as in the Social Democratic Party of Hungary from the early 1920s. For this, he was put under police surveillance. In 1936 he switched to the Independent Smallholders' Party and became a functionary in the Kisalföld Chamber of Agriculture. Although he was not a member of the Communist Party, he was arrested several times during the regency of Miklós Horthy.

World War II
During the war he became one of the leaders of the Hungarian resistance until he was called up for duty, returning in the summer of 1945.

Post war
By the end of World War II he had become a leading member of the Smallholders Party, which achieved a majority in the 1945 general elections. Dobi was a member of the left-wing faction of that party, and advocated cooperation with the communists.

With the Smallholders being a part of Hungary's post-war coalition government, Dobi served as Minister of Agriculture from February 1946 to November 1946 (under prime minister Ferenc Nagy) and again from April 1948 to December 1948 (under Lajos Dinnyés). As a leading member of the Smallholders' left wing, Dobi contributed some much needed legitimacy to a government that was increasingly dominated by Communists. After several splits and the expulsion, arrest or exile of anti-communist members ("salami tactics"), Dobi was elected chairman of the Smallholders Party in June 1947. The party concluded an alliance with the communists, social democrats and National Peasant Party for the rigged 1947 parliamentary election.

Due in part to his strong support of the Communists, he replaced fellow Smallholder Lajos Dinnyés as prime minister in December 1948, helping preside over the final stage of the Communists' complete takeover of the country. In short order, Dobi pushed out those elements of his party who were unwilling to do the Communists' bidding, leaving the party in the hands of fellow travelers like himself. This process was repeated with the other non-Communist parties as well.

Thus, by the time of the 1949 elections, Hungary was effectively a one-party state. The 1949 elections formalized this status, with voters only having the option of approving or rejecting a Communist-dominated list. One of the first acts of the newly elected National Assembly was to approve a Soviet-style constitution, formally marking the onset of out-and-out Communist rule in Hungary. The Smallholders' Party was effectively disbanded.

In terms of allegations of collaboration with the party, the New Hungarian Encyclopedia summed up Dobi's role in the Communist takeover in this way: "Following the ousting of the Smallholders Party right wing elements, he was selected to be president. Under his direction the party was cleansed of its reactionary elements and it became part of the program for building a people's democracy with the Communists."

Presidency of the People's Republic
In 1952, he gave up the prime ministership because Communist Party leader Mátyás Rákosi wanted that post for himself. Dobi was then promoted to Chairman of the Presidential Council (ceremonial head of state) from 1952 until his retirement in April 1967. Through taking on numerous other high-profile roles, he eventually became the second or third most powerful man in Hungary. He supported the crushing of the Hungarian Revolution of 1956. Having been a "crypto-communist" for many years, Dobi formally joined the Hungarian Socialist Workers' Party in 1959. He was awarded the Lenin Peace Prize in 1962. He died in Budapest in 1968.

References
 Writings of István Dobi, Politikatörténeti és Szakszervezeti Levéltár, PIL 769. f.
 Hungarian Biographical Lexicon
 Biography In: Országgyűlési Almanach 1947–1949, Budapest, 2005, 

1898 births
1968 deaths
People from Komárom
People from the Kingdom of Hungary
Independent Smallholders, Agrarian Workers and Civic Party politicians
Members of the Hungarian Socialist Workers' Party
Presidents of Hungary
Prime Ministers of Hungary
Agriculture ministers of Hungary
Members of the National Assembly of Hungary (1945–1947)
Members of the National Assembly of Hungary (1947–1949)
Lenin Peace Prize recipients